Tumbleweed Trail is a 1946 American Western film directed by Robert Emmett Tansey and written by Frances Kavanaugh. The film stars Eddie Dean, Roscoe Ates, Shirley Patterson, Johnny McGovern, Bob Duncan, Ted Adams, Jack O'Shea, Kermit Maynard and William Fawcett. The film was released on July 10, 1946, by Producers Releasing Corporation.

Plot

Cast          
Eddie Dean as Eddie Dean
Roscoe Ates as Soapy Jones
Shirley Patterson as Robin Ryan
Johnny McGovern as Freckles Ryan
Bob Duncan as Brad Barton
Ted Adams as Alton Small
Jack O'Shea as Gringo
Kermit Maynard as Bill Ryan
William Fawcett as Judge Town
Flash as Eddie's Horse

References

External links
 

1946 films
1940s English-language films
American Western (genre) films
1946 Western (genre) films
Producers Releasing Corporation films
Films directed by Robert Emmett Tansey
American black-and-white films
1940s American films